SP-333  is a state highway in the state of São Paulo in Brazil serving the main cities of Ribeirão Preto, Sertãozinho, Jaboticabal, Itápolis, Marília, Assis and Tarumã at the shores of the Paranapanema River, by the border with Paraná.

References

Highways in São Paulo (state)